Rømskog was a municipality in former Østfold county, Norway.  The administrative centre of the municipality was the village of Rømskog. The former municipality of Rømskog was separated from Rødenes on 1 January 1902.

Rømskog was well known as one of the smallest municipalities in Norway, in numbers of citizens, with just above 600 citizens.

The word "skog" means "forest" in Norwegian, and that is what Rømskog consists of together with the agricultural landscape. Farms and huge / deep forests and small lakes like the lake of Rømsjøen. Deep forests that Rømskog shares with the neighbouring municipalities across the border of Sweden.

At January 1. 2020 Rømskog merged with neighbouring Aurskog Høland kommune (municipality)

General information

Name
The Old Norse form of the name was Rymsskógr. The first element is the genitive case of the name of the lake Rymr (now Rømsjøen) and the last element is skógr which means "wood" or "forest".  The meaning of the name Rymr is unknown.

Coat-of-arms
The coat-of-arms is from modern times.  They were granted on 22 July 1983.  The arms show a pair of silver logging tongs on a blue background. Since forestry is the main source of income for the municipality, it was considered an appropriate symbol.

References

External links

Municipal fact sheet from Statistics Norway

 
Municipalities of Østfold
Villages in Østfold